Hindki, is a village in the Khyber Pakhtunkhwa province of Pakistan. It is located at 32°59'26N 70°34'23E with an altitude of 362 metres (1190 feet).

References

Villages in Khyber Pakhtunkhwa